Jonathan Seth Kanter (born July 30, 1973) is an American antitrust attorney who has served as assistant attorney general for the Department of Justice (DOJ) Antitrust Division since November 16, 2021. Prior to this, Kanter worked as an antitrust attorney at the Federal Trade Commission (FTC) and in private practice. 

Considered a critic of Big Tech, Kanter is closely associated with the anti-monopolistic New Brandeis movement. As assistant attorney general, Kanter has worked with FTC chair Lina Khan on efforts to reform federal merger guidelines. During his tenure, the DOJ won its first conviction in a criminal monopolization suit in four decades.

Early life and education 
Kanter was born July 30, 1973, in Queens, New York City to elementary school teachers. Kanter's paternal grandfather was an immigrant from Ukrainewho worked as a professional plumber. Kanter keeps his citizenship papers in his office.

He graduated from the State University of New York at Albany in 1995 with a Bachelor of Arts. He then attended the Washington University School of Law, graduating in 1998 with a Juris Doctor degree.

Legal career 
After graduating from law school, Kanter first worked as an antitrust lawyer at the Federal Trade Commission (FTC) from 1998 to 2000. Kanter later worked in private practice, where he represented clients including Microsoft and Yelp. From 2000 to 2007, he was an associate at Fried, Frank, Harris, Shriver & Jacobson. 

Kanter was a partner at Cadwalader, Wickersham & Taft from 2007 to 2016, then at Paul, Weiss, Rifkind, Wharton & Garrison from 2016 to 2020. In 2020, he left Paul, Weiss and founded his own law firm, The Kanter Law Group, where he worked until his appointment in 2021 to lead the Justice Department's Antitrust Division.

Assistant Attorney General

Selection and confirmation 
According to Politico, Kanter's selection "came after the longest delay for a nominee to lead the office in modern history," following months of speculation surrounding his eventual nomination. On July 20, 2021, Kanter was formally nominated to serve as assistant attorney general in the Department of Justice Antitrust Division. His nomination was endorsed by nine former assistant attorneys general for the Antitrust Division, including Makan Delrahim, who served in the position under Donald Trump. 

On October 6, 2021, a hearing on his nomination was held before the Senate Judiciary Committee. On October 28, 2021, his nomination was favorably reported out of committee. On November 16, 2021, Kanter was confirmed by the United States Senate in a 68–29 vote, and was sworn in the same day.

Tenure 

As assistant attorney general, Kanter has collaborated with FTC Chair Lina Khan on efforts to reform federal merger guidelines. This has been described as a signal that both agencies are set to intensify their scrutiny of large mergers. 

According to The National Law Journal, Kanter has largely chosen DOJ and other government officials for staffing positions at the Antitrust Division, which differs from his predecessors, who primarily chose former BigLaw attorneys for these roles. To assist the DOJ as it scrutinizes anti-competitive behavior in digital markets, Kanter has announced that the division will hire more data analysts and other technology experts.

Under Kanter, the DOJ successfully got its first conviction in a criminal monopoly case in over four decades. As assistant attorney general, Kanter presided over the DOJ's first-ever victory in a case over criminal enforcement of labor antitrust violations.

Interlocking directorates 
During his time in office, Kanter has intensified scrutiny of anti-competitive interlocking directorates, in which an individual serves on the boards of competing companies in the same industry. Legal analysts have noted that section 8 of the Clayton Antitrust Act of 1914 forbids individuals from simultaneously holding director positions in companies in competition with each other, but that this law has largely been unenforced over the past century.

In October 2022, renewed scrutiny of anti-competitive interlocking directorate agreements led to the resignation of seven directors at five companies. As part of the DOJ's scrutiny of private equity firms, it was reported that the department is investigating potential violations by firms including Blackstone and Apollo Global Management.

Google recusal effort 

Following Kanter's inauguration, Google wrote to the DOJ to request Kanter's recusal from the United States v. Google antitrust case. According to The New York Times, Google's complaint centered on Kanter's past criticism of the company's business practices, which Google considered proof of his lack of impartiality in the case, as well as his past representation of Google competitors. Google's request for recusal was criticized as lacking legal basis by Laurence Tribe, professor emeritus at Harvard Law School, as well as by Senator Elizabeth Warren, who accused Google of trying to "bully law enforcement."

In May 2022, it was reported that Kanter would be temporarily barred from participating in antitrust scrutiny of Google until the DOJ decides if he must ultimately recuse himself. In response, a coalition of 28 advocacy groups wrote in favor of allowing Kanter to continue his participation in the case. According a June 2022 report in The Daily Beast, the decision of whether to allow Kanter to participate in United States v. Google would fall on Vanita Gupta, associate attorney general.

In January 2023, it was reported that Kanter would be cleared to continue to work on DOJ cases involving Google.

Political views 
Throughout his career, Kanter has been a critic of Big Tech. Kanter has questioned the value of the dominant "consumer welfare standard" in antitrust policy, arguing that the purpose of antitrust enforcement "is not to decide what is maximally efficient, but to enforce the law". 

Kanter has been described as being associated with the anti-monopolistic New Brandeis movement alongside FTC chair Lina Khan and National Economic Council (NEC) advisor Tim Wu. Kanter's approach to antitrust enforcement has been criticized by former Secretary of the Treasury Lawrence Summers.

See also
Department of Justice appointments by Joe Biden

References 

1973 births
Living people
20th-century American lawyers
21st-century American lawyers
Antitrust lawyers
Biden administration personnel
Federal Trade Commission personnel
Lawyers from New York City
United States Assistant Attorneys General for the Antitrust Division
University at Albany, SUNY alumni
Washington University School of Law alumni
American people of Ukrainian descent